Ragged Mountain is a summit in Garfield County, Utah, in the United States with an elevation of .

Ragged Mountain was named for its jagged peak.

References

Mountains of Garfield County, Utah
Mountains of Utah